Víctor Batista Falla (21 January 1933 – 12 April 2020) was a Cuban editor and publisher.

Biography
Batista's father, Agustín Batista y González de Mendoza, was the founder of the Trust Company of Cuba, the most powerful Cuban bank prior to the Cuban Revolution. His mother, María Teresa Falla Bonet, was the daughter of Laureano Falla Gutiérrez, a powerful sugar tycoon. He was also the uncle of Maria Teresa, Grand Duchess of Luxembourg.

Batista fled Cuba following the Cuban Revolution and settled in New York City. In the United States, he financed the creation of the magazine Exilio, intended for publishing young writers in exile. He then founded the Colibrí publishing house in Madrid on the proposal of Jesús Díaz. He lived there for most of the remainder of his life.

After 60 years in exile, Batista returned to Cuba in April 2020, where he contracted COVID-19 and died in Havana.

References

1933 births
2020 deaths
Deaths from the COVID-19 pandemic in Cuba
People from Havana
Cuban expatriates in Spain
Cuban expatriates in the United States
Publishers (people)